The Canton of Nérondes is a former canton situated in the Cher département and in the Centre region of France. It was disbanded following the French canton reorganisation which came into effect in March 2015. It consisted of 13 communes, which joined the canton of La Guerche-sur-l'Aubois in 2015. It had 4,829 inhabitants (2012).

Geography
An area of forestry and farming in the northeastern part of the arrondissement of Saint-Amand-Montrond centred on the town of Nérondes. The altitude varies from 169m at Charly to 270m at Croisy, with an average altitude of 205m.

The canton comprised 13 communes:

Blet
Charly
Cornusse
Croisy
Flavigny
Ignol
Lugny-Bourbonnais
Menetou-Couture
Mornay-Berry
Nérondes
Ourouer-les-Bourdelins
Saint-Hilaire-de-Gondilly
Tendron

Population

See also
 Arrondissements of the Cher department
 Cantons of the Cher department
 Communes of the Cher department

References

Nerondes
2015 disestablishments in France
States and territories disestablished in 2015